The Chevrolet Special Deluxe Series AH Fleetline is an automobile which was produced by US automaker Chevrolet from 1941 to 1952. From 1946 to 1948 it was a sub-series of the Chevrolet Fleetmaster rather than a series of the Special Deluxe and from 1949 to 1951 it was a sub-series of both the Chevrolet Special and the Chevrolet Deluxe. In its final year it was offered only as a sub-series of the latter.

The Fleetline was introduced late in the 1941 model year as a four-door sedan only. In 1942, a fastback two-door "Aerosedan" was also offered while the sedan was renamed "Sport Master". In 1947, the Fleetline made up 71.26% of Chevrolet's sales. For the years' 1949 through 1952 models, the fastback was the only one offered, and Chevrolet dropped the Fleetline for 1953. Production was indefinitely  delayed in 1942 due to World War II, after 110,000  had been made, though several thousand Chevrolet coupes and sedans were produced during the war years for military staff use. In 1945, production for civilians resumed.  The original series was produced through 1948.

A redesigned Fleetline with reduced body contour and integrated rear fenders was offered for the 1949 through 1952 model years. It was referred to as a "fastback" because of its distinct sloping roof which extends through to the trunk lid.  The Fleetline during the 1949 to 1950 years also has a lower look than a sedan, with the windshield being one inch shorter in height than a standard contemporary sedan.  The 1949 to 1951 models were made in both four-door and two-door models, with only the lower portion of the doors being interchangeable with a sedan door.  The Fleetline series is currently highly collectable. Many are made into street rods, with the common Chevrolet 350 small block V8 and the 350 or 400 turbo transmission being used.

Specifications 

In the 1941 and 1942 model years, the 216 cid inline-six "Blue Flame" engine was the only one offered. It produced 90 horsepower at 3,300 rpm, and in 1950 higher compression bumped it up to 92 horsepower. A Fleetline of this vintage could easily exceed 80 miles per hour without overdrive. In very early models, the transmission was a manual synchromesh three-speed, with vacuum-assisted shift, in which the "three-on-the-tree" shifter was able to be moved between gears by the slightest pressure on the lever. Third gear was direct, meaning the input and output are equal speeds. From 1950 through the 1952 final year of its production, an automatic transmission was offered, which was quite sluggish. Overdrive  was a rare option. Connection to the third member rear-end was via an enclosed "torque tube" driveshaft. The brakes were hydraulic with all-wheel drums. In 1951, the brakes got larger. The master cylinder was located below the floor connected on the frame rail, beneath the driver. Shock absorbers were of the lever type for the early years only. The windshield for all years was of a split, flat-glass type.

Style 

The exterior sported smooth curves, chrome and stainless trim.   In the earlier models the rear bumper had an optional center bumper guard that had to be ratcheted out of the way so the trunk cover could be lifted.  Front and rear bumpers had optional chrome "tips", a dress-up item that bolted to the ends of the stock bumper. Not a Chevrolet option but a popular after market feature was a large external sunshade that protected the driver from glare off of the metal dash board. The 1949 to 1952 models were completely different from the earlier years' with the fleetline "fastback" shape being quite distinct from a normal sedan shape. The fastback appearance was shared with all General Motors products from 1942 until 1949, where the appearance is called a "Club Coupe" or "Sedanette" depending on the brand.

The interior had cloth bench seats and a metal dash sometimes with a simulated burle woodgrain. The radio was a simple mono vacuum tube type radio with integrated speaker. An ash tray was located in the right side of the dash, close to the clock Depending upon the year there were both choke and throttle cables on the dash. On the right side was the choke lever. In the earlier years the clock was integrated into the glove compartment door and was of a manual-wind seven-day type. In the 1949 and 1950 models the clock was next to the glove box and with the redesigned dash board, the clock was on the top of the dash, in a center pod.  Also, this revised dash had two round pods for the speedometer and the other gauges while the 1949 and 1950 models had one large round pod directly in front of the steering wheel on the dash.

Chevrolet Fleetline production figures 1946 to 1952

1946 total U.S. production:

Fleetline Aerosedan - two-door 57,932

Fleetline Sportmaster - four-door sedan 7,501

1947 total U.S. production:

Fleetline Aerosedan - two-door 159,407

Fleetline Sportmaster - four-door sedan

1948 total U.S. production:

Fleetline Aerosedan - two-door 211,861

Fleetline Sportmaster - four-door sedan  64,217

1949 total U.S. production:

Fleetline Deluxe - two-door sedan 180,251

Fleetline Deluxe - four-door sedan 130,323

Fleetline Special - two-door sedan 58,514

Fleetline Special - four-door sedan 36,317

1950 total U.S. production:

Fleetline Deluxe - two-door sedan 189,509

Fleetline Deluxe - four-door sedan 124,287

Fleetline Special - two-door sedan 43,682

Fleetline Special - four-door sedan 23,277

1951 total U.S. production:

Fleetline Deluxe - two-door sedan 131,910

Fleetline Deluxe - four-door sedan 57,693

Fleetline Special - two-door sedan 6,441

Fleetline Special - four-door sedan 3,364

1952 total U.S. production:

Fleetline Deluxe - two-door sedan 37,164

References

External links
Chevrolet Fleetline on Vintage Ads

Fleetline
Cars introduced in 1941